Julien Maitron (Dompierre-sur-Nièvre, 20 February 1881 – Tourriers, 29 October 1972) was a French professional road bicycle racer, who competed in the 1904 to 1912 Tours de France. He won one stage in the 1910 Tour de France, and had his best overall position in the 1904 Tour de France when he finished fifth.

Major results

1910
Tour de France:
Winner stage 6

External links 

Official Tour de France results for Julien Maitron

French male cyclists
1881 births
1972 deaths
French Tour de France stage winners
Sportspeople from Nièvre
Cyclists from Bourgogne-Franche-Comté